Marie d'Orléans (Marie of Orléans) may refer to:

Marie of Orléans (1457–1493), daughter of Charles, Duke of Orléans (1394–1465), sister of Louis XII
Marie d'Orleans-Longueville, Duchess de Nemours (1625–1707), daughter of Duke of Longueville, stepdaughter of Anne Genevieve of Bourbon-Condé
Marie Louise d'Orléans (1662–1689), eldest daughter of Philippe de France and Princess Henrietta Anne of England; later Queen of Spain as wife of Charles II
Princess Marie Louise Élisabeth d'Orléans (1695–1719), daughter of Philippe II, Duke of Orléans, wife of Charles, Duke of Berry (1686–1714)
Maria Amalia of Naples and Sicily (1782–1866), who became Duchess of Orléans
Princess Marie of Orléans (1813–1839), daughter of Louis-Philippe of France (1773–1850) and Maria Amalia of Naples and Sicily
Princess Marie Isabelle of Orléans (1848–1919)
Marie of Orléans (1865–1909), cousin of the above and daughter of Robert, Duke of Chartres
Princess Marie Louise of Orléans (1896–1973), daughter of Prince Emmanuel, Duke of Vendôme and Princess Henriette of Belgium